Lygodactylus kimhowelli, also known commonly as Kim Howell's dwarf gecko, the Tanzanian dwarf gecko, and the zebra dwarf gecko, is a species of lizard in the family Gekkonidae. The species is endemic to Tanzania.

Etymology
The specific name, kimhowelli, is in honor of herpetologist Mr. Kim Monroe Howell (born 1945).

Reproduction
L. kimhowelli is oviparous.

References

Further reading
Pasteur G (1995). "Biodiversité et reptiles: diagnoses de sept nouvelles espèces fossiles et actuelles du genre de lézards Lygodactylus (Sauria: Gekkonidae)". Dumerilia 2: 1–21. (Lygodactylus kimhowelli, new species). (in French).
Rösler H (2000). "Kommentierte Liste der rezent, subrezent und fossil bekannten Geckotaxa (Reptilia: Gekkonomorpha)". Gekkota 2: 28–153. (Lygodactylus kimhowelli, p. 93). (in German).
Spawls, Stephen; Howell, Kim; Hinkel, Harald; Menegon, Michele (2018). Field Guide to East African Reptiles, Second Edition. London: Bloomsbury Natural History. 624 pp. .

Lygodactylus
Reptiles described in 1995
Taxa named by Georges Pasteur
Endemic fauna of Tanzania
Reptiles of Tanzania